Wissmann is a German surname. Notable people with the surname include:

Hermann Wissmann (1853–1905), German explorer and administrator in Africa, who gave his name to:
Wissmann Bay at the northern tip of Lake Malawi
Hermann von Wissmann (steamship) 1890, anti-slavery gunboat
Matthias Wissmann (born 1949), German politician and automobile lobbyist

See also
Wissman

German-language surnames